Where In The World was an early evening quiz programme shown on Channel 4 in the UK. The quiz tested contestants' knowledge of geography and was produced by HTV West from about 1983 until 1985. The programme was hosted by Ray Alan. Alan previously hosted a version that was shown on BBC1 in the early 1970s, replacing original host Michael Parkinson.

References

External links

1970s British game shows
1983 British television series debuts
1985 British television series endings
BBC television game shows
Channel 4 game shows
1980s British game shows
English-language television shows
Television shows produced by Harlech Television (HTV)
Television series by ITV Studios